Charles R. H. Tripp is an academic and author specializing in the politics and history of the Near and Middle East.

Tripp's main areas of research include the study of state and society in the Middle East, especially Iraq, and Islamic political thought.

He lectures on government and politics of the Middle East for both undergraduates and postgraduates at the School of Oriental and African Studies (SOAS), a college of the University of London.

Professor Tripp is a world class specialist on Iraq and has contributed as regional expert to media broadcasters including the BBC and NPR, as well as to print media such as Foreign Affairs, The Guardian and the New Statesman. In the run up to the war against Iraq, Professor Tripp was part of a small team that visited 10 Downing Street in order to advise the prime minister, Tony Blair, on the consequences of going to war.

On 19 November 2008, Tripp gave his inaugural lecture as Professor of Politics at SOAS entitled 'The Riotous Politics of the Middle East', in which he was presented by Oxford International Relations professor Avi Shlaim.

Selected publications
 1996: Iran-Saudi Arabia Relations and Regional Order (with S. Chubin)
 2000: A History of Iraq (2nd Ed. published 2002; 3rd Ed. published 2007)
 2006: Islam and the Moral Economy: the challenge of capitalism (2006)
 2013: ''The Power and the People: paths of resistance in the Middle East"" (Cambridge University Press)

Editorial work
 1995-2008: Editor of the multidisciplinary Cambridge Middle East Studies series

References

External links
 SOAS Staff Profile
 Interview in The Guardian newspaper, September 2007
 Charles Tripp talks to the BBC about Iraq, May 2003
 Interview on National Public Radio (NPR), February 2003 (Radio stream and full transcript)

Academics of SOAS University of London
Living people
Year of birth missing (living people)